Víctor Selvino Arenhart (23 December 1949 – 17 May 2010) was the first Roman Catholic bishop of the Roman Catholic Diocese of Oberá, Argentina.

Ordained on 5 March 1977, Selvino Arenhart was appointed the first bishop of the newly created Oberá Diocese by Pope Benedict XVI on 13 June 2009 and was ordained bishop on 15 August 2009.  The bishop died while still in office.

References

1949 births
2010 deaths
21st-century Roman Catholic bishops in Argentina
Roman Catholic bishops of Oberá